Donovan Michael Sullivan (29 October 1916 – 28 September 2013) was a Canadian-born British art historian and collector, and one of the major Western pioneers in the field of modern Chinese art history and criticism.

Sullivan was born in Toronto, Ontario, and moved to England at the age of three. He was the youngest of five children of Alan Sullivan (pen name Sinclair Murray), a Canadian mining engineer turned novelist and his wife Elisabeth (née Hees). Sullivan was a graduate of Rugby School and graduated from the University of Cambridge in architecture in 1939. He was in China from 1940 to 1946 with the International and Chinese Red Cross followed by teaching and doing museum work in Chengdu, where he met and married Wu Huan (Khoan), a biologist who gave up her career to work with him.

He received a PhD from Harvard University (1952) and a post-doctoral Bollingen Fellowship. He subsequently taught in the University of Singapore, and returned to London in the 1960s to teach at the School of Oriental and African Studies. Then he became Christensen Professor of Chinese art in the Department of Art at Stanford University from 1966 to 1984, before moving to the University of Oxford as a Fellow by Special Election at St Catherine's College, Oxford. He lived in Oxford, England. He was Slade Professor of Fine Art at the University of Oxford for 1973–74.

Sullivan was a major art collector who owned more than 400 works of art, including paintings by Chinese masters Qi Baishi, Zhang Daqian, and Wu Guanzhong. His was one of the world's most significant collections of modern Chinese art. He bequeathed his collection to the Ashmolean Museum in Oxford, which has a gallery dedicated to Sullivan and his wife Khoan.

Selected publications
 
 Symbols of Eternity, Oxford University Press, 1979, 
 
 
 
 ; University of California Press, 1984,  (revised edn of A Short History of Chinese Art, 1967)

Reviews
"Review: A Great Leap Forward for Modern Chinese Art History? Recent Publications in China and the United States-A Review Article", Ralph C. Croizier, The Journal of Asian Studies, Vol. 57, No. 3 (Aug., 1998), pp. 786–793

References

1916 births
2013 deaths
Academics of SOAS University of London
Academics of the University of Cambridge
Alumni of Corpus Christi College, Cambridge
British art collectors
British art historians
British expatriates in China
Canadian emigrants to the United Kingdom
Chinese art
Fellows of St Catherine's College, Oxford
Harvard University alumni
Historians of East Asian art
People associated with the University of Singapore
People educated at Rugby School
People from Toronto
Slade Professors of Fine Art (University of Oxford)
Stanford University Department of Art and Art History faculty
Sullivan
Chinese art collectors